Bark mills, also known as Catskill's mills, are water, steam, horse, ox or wind-powered edge mills used to process the bark, roots, and branches of various tree species into a fine powder known as tanbark, used for tanning leather. This powdering allowed the tannin to be extracted more efficiently from its woody source material. A barker would strip the bark from trees so that it might be ground in such mills, and the dried bark was often stored in bark houses.

Machinery 
Various machinery was used to chop, grind, riddle and pound the bark. These included Farcot’s bark-cutting machine (used extensively in France), Weldon’s bark-grinding mill, and a device known as a Wiltze's mill or Catskill's mill (prevalent in 19th-century America).

Manufacturers 
 Goldie & McCulloch Company Ltd., was a Canadian steam engine manufacturer
 Huxhams & Brown, Exeter

Known examples

in Australia 

 The Swansea, Tasmania bark Mill processed black wattle bark in colonial times and is now a combined museum.

In Canada 
 Mill in Dartmouth North Community Centre, a Community centre in Albro Lake a neighbourhood in the north end of the community of Dartmouth in Nova Scotia's Halifax Regional Municipality

In Germany 
 Mill in Lauterecken
 Mill in Niederhambach, Birkenfeld district, Rhineland-Palatinate

In the Netherlands 
 De Weert, Meppel, a smock mill in Meppel, Drenthe

In the United Kingdom

In England 
 Bampton Bark Mill, in Bampton, Devon, England
 Overshot waterwheel at Combe House Hotel in Holford, Somerset, England. It was used to grind oak bark for the tannery complex established here in the 1840s. When the tannery closed in 1900 the waterwheel was adapted to other uses such as grinding grain for grist, cutting chaff, chopping apples for the cider press and generating electricity. It also cracked stones in a nearby quarry.
 Terling Windmill, in Terling, Essex - a grade II listed Smock mill. The mill was originally a bark mill, but was advertised for sale in 1818 as "new built", easily convertible to corn grinding.
 Heigham, Norwich - A tannery in Heigham, Norwich, Norfolk was advertised for sale in 1853. It was again advertised for sale and removal in 1863. It may have been moved to a new site and converted to a drainage mill.

In Scotland 

 Beith Bark Mill, in Beith, North Ayrshire - On the east bank of Kilbirnie Loch near Beith in North Ayrshire stood a Bark Mill, most built by the Muir's of Mains House. It is marked on OS maps, and was powered by the combined Mains and Bath Burns with mill ponds indicated. The mill produced ground bark for use in the Beith Bath Lane tannery, using bark from the old oak trees that forested the loch side. Later the mill became a furniture factory run by Matthew Pollock who applied the use of machinery to help with the manufacture of furniture in 1858. This site was one mile from the Beith town centre. The Glasgow & South Western Railway Company constructed a siding, known as 'Muir's siding' for the convenience of transporting the finished products, etc. The site was isolated and inconvenient for the workers and was eventually sold to Robert Balfour, who later built a new factory near Beith Town Station, the West of Scotland Cabinet Works. The Muirs had been tanners for many generations and around 1791 John Muir and Sons, Tanners, Curriers, and Fancy Leather Manufacturers had become established at the Bath Lane works. William Muir of Mains joined as a partner in 1846.
 Mill on the Fleet, in Gatehouse of Fleet, Castle Douglas - Built in 1788 as a cotton spinning mill by James Birtwhistle from Yorkshire. The water wheel on the gable end was used to drive the machinery to spin the cotton. By 1800 the cotton industry in Gatehouse declined and by 1850 the mills were out of use. In 1859 they were bought by the Helme brothers from Dalbeattie and the mill was used as a store and bark mill.
 Mill in Hessilhead

In the United States 
 Mill in Bradford, Massachusetts
 Mill in New Boston, New Hampshire
 Mill in New Milford Plant of the Hackensack Water Company, New Jersey
 Mill in Barkcamp State Park, Belmont County, Ohio

Gallery

See also 
 List of types of mill

References

External links 

 Commentary and video on the Bark Mill at Beith

Industrial buildings
Grinding mills
Tanning (leather)
History of forestry